James Earl Britt (born September 12, 1960) is a former American football cornerback in the National Football League (NFL). He was drafted by the Atlanta Falcons in the second round of the 1983 NFL Draft. He played college football at Louisiana State University (LSU).

References

1960 births
Living people
Sportspeople from Minden, Louisiana
Players of American football from Louisiana
American football cornerbacks
American football safeties
LSU Tigers football players
Atlanta Falcons players